Gregory John Markkanen (born March 7, 1958) is a Republican member of the Michigan House of Representatives.

Before his election in 2018, Markkanen ran for state representative in 2016, but was defeated by then incumbent, Scott Dianda. Markkanen holds a professional teaching certificate from the state of Michigan, and did teach high school civics, history and geography for Baraga Area Schools, Markkanen is an Endowed Life Member of the National Rifle Association.

References

External links 
 Gregory Markkanen at gophouse.org

Living people
Northern Michigan University alumni
Michigan Technological University alumni
Republican Party members of the Michigan House of Representatives
21st-century American politicians
1958 births